Three special elections were held in  in 1793 to fill vacancies caused by the resignation, prior to the start of the 3rd Congress, of three representatives-elect.

First special election 

The first special election was held on April 8, 1793, after Jonathan Sturges (P) declined to serve the term for which he'd been elected

Second special election 
Benjamin Huntington (P) also resigned his seat before the start of Congress and was replaced by Jonathan Ingersoll in a special election held on September 16, 1793.

Third special election 
A pair of openings lead to a two-seat special election: 1. Member-elect Jonathan Ingersoll declined to serve from the September special election; and 2. Member-elect Stephen M. Mitchell declined to serve from the general election when he was appointed to the U.S. Senate.

A third election was held for their replacements, with the top two winning seats in the 3rd Congress: Joshua Coit (Pro-Administration) and Zephaniah Swift (Pro-Administration).

See also 
List of special elections to the United States House of Representatives
1792 and 1793 United States House of Representatives elections

References 

Connecticut at-large
Connecticut 1793
1793 special
Connecticut at-large
United States House
United States House of Representatives 1793 at-large